Jack Arden Davenport (September 7, 1931 – September 21, 1951) was a former Golden Gloves boxer and a United States Marine who posthumously received the Medal of Honor for his heroic actions and sacrifice of life during the Korean War.

Biography
Jack Davenport was born September 7, 1931, in Kansas City, Missouri, where he graduated from high school in 1949. While in high school, he was a newspaper carrier for the Kansas City Star and played American Legion baseball for three seasons. Upon completing high school, he studied for a year at the University of Kansas, where he was a member of the freshman football team.

He enlisted in the Marine Corps on July 25, 1950, and completed his recruit training at Marine Corps Recruit Depot San Diego, California, that September. He was then stationed with the Training and Replacement Command at Camp Pendleton, California, until December 1950, when he embarked to join the 5th Marines in Korea.

In the early morning of September 21, 1951, Corporal Davenport sacrificed his life to save the life of a fellow Marine Priv. Robert W Smith in Korea. He was standing watch together with Priv. Smith when an enemy hand grenade landed in their foxhole. Without thought of his own safety, Davenport found the grenade in the dark and smothered its explosion with his own body in order to save the life of his fellow Marine.

His body was returned to the United States in January 1952 to be buried at Mount Moriah Cemetery, Hickman Mills, Missouri. Davenport's father, Fred received the Medal of Honor on January 7, 1953, from U.S. Secretary of the Navy Dan A. Kimball in Washington, D.C.

Medal of Honor citation 
For conspicuous gallantry and intrepidity at the risk of his life above and beyond the call of duty while serving as a Squad Leader in Company G, Third Battalion, Fifth Marines, First Marine Division (Reinforced), in action against enemy aggressor forces in the vicinity of Seongnae-Dong, Korea, early on the morning of 21 September 1951. While expertly directing the defense of his position during a probing attack by hostile forces attempting the infiltrate the area, Corporal Davenport, acting quickly when an enemy grenade fell into the foxhole which he was occupying with Private Robert Smith another young Marine, skillfully located the deadly projectile in the dark and, undeterred by the personal risk involved, heroically threw himself over the live missile, thereby saving his companion from serious injury or possible death. His cool and resourceful leadership were contributing factors in the successful repulse of the enemy attack and his superb courage and admirable spirit of self-sacrifice in the face of almost certain death enhance and sustain the highest traditions of the United States Naval Service. Corporal Davenport gallantly gave his life for his country.

The video of Corporal Davenport's Medal of Honor ceremony is available at: https://www.youtube.com/watch?v=0GeVtVQAmvo

Awards and decorations

See also

List of Medal of Honor recipients
List of Korean War Medal of Honor recipients

References

http://www.marinemedals.com/davenportjack.htm 

1931 births
1951 deaths
Boxers from Missouri
United States Marine Corps Medal of Honor recipients
United States Marine Corps non-commissioned officers
American military personnel killed in the Korean War
Korean War recipients of the Medal of Honor
Sportspeople from Kansas City, Missouri
American male boxers
Deaths by hand grenade
Burials in Missouri
United States Marine Corps personnel of the Korean War